The 1974 New York Mets season was the 13th regular season for the Mets, who played home games at Shea Stadium. Led by manager Yogi Berra, the team finished the season with a record of 71–91, placing fifth in the National League East. This was the first time the Mets had a losing season since 1968.

Offseason 
 March 26, 1974: Buzz Capra was purchased from the Mets by the Atlanta Braves.

Regular season

Season standings

Record vs. opponents

Opening Day starters 
Wayne Garrett
Jerry Grote
Don Hahn
Bud Harrelson
Cleon Jones
Jerry Koosman
Félix Millán
John Milner
Rusty Staub

Notable transactions 
 June 5, 1974: Bob Myrick was drafted by the Mets in the 20th round of the 1974 Major League Baseball Draft.

Roster

Player stats

Batting

Starters by position 
Note: Pos = Position; G = Games played; AB = At bats; H = Hits; Avg. = Batting average; HR = Home runs; RBI = Runs batted in

Other batters 
Note: G = Games played; AB = At bats; H = Hits; Avg. = Batting average; HR = Home runs; RBI = Runs batted in

Pitching

Starting pitchers 
Note: G = Games pitched; IP = Innings pitched; W = Wins; L = Losses; ERA = Earned run average; SO = Strikeouts

Other pitchers 
Note: G = Games pitched; IP = Innings pitched; W = Wins; L = Losses; ERA = Earned run average; SO = Strikeouts

Relief pitchers 
Note: G = Games pitched; W = Wins; L = Losses; SV = Saves; ERA = Earned run average; SO = Strikeouts

Farm system 

LEAGUE CHAMPIONS: Victoria

Notes

References 

1974 New York Mets at Baseball Reference
1974 New York Mets team page at www.baseball-almanac.com

External links
New York Mets 1974 schedule at MLB.com

New York Mets seasons
New York Mets season
New York
1970s in Queens